Alexandru Florian Zaharia (born 25 May 1990) is a Romanian  professional footballer who plays as a left winger for CSM Focșani.

Honours
CSA Steaua București
Liga III: 2020–21

References

External links

 
 

1990 births
Living people
Sportspeople from Craiova
Romanian footballers
Association football midfielders
Liga I players
Liga II players
CS Turnu Severin players
ASC Oțelul Galați players
CS Gaz Metan Mediaș players
ASC Daco-Getica București players
FC Politehnica Iași (2010) players
FC Petrolul Ploiești players
CSA Steaua București footballers
CSM Focșani players